The canton of Brioude is an administrative division of the Haute-Loire department, south-central France. It was created at the French canton reorganisation which came into effect in March 2015. Its seat is in Brioude.

It consists of the following communes:
 
Beaumont
Bournoncle-Saint-Pierre
Brioude
Chaniat
Cohade
Fontannes
Lamothe
Lavaudieu
Paulhac
Saint-Géron
Saint-Laurent-Chabreuges
Vieille-Brioude

References

Cantons of Haute-Loire